A current in a fluid is the magnitude and direction of flow within each portion of that fluid, such as a liquid or a gas.

Types of fluid currents include:
 Air current
 Water current
 Current (hydrology), a current in a river or stream
 Ocean current
 Longshore current
 Boundary current
 Rip current
 Rip tide
 Subsurface currents
 Turbidity current
 Tidal current

See also
Laminar flow

Fluid dynamics